Ahirwati (Ahīrvāṭī, sometimes also known as Hīrwāṭī) is an Indo-Aryan dialect of India. It is spoken within the Ahirwal region located to the south-west of the capital Delhi. It belongs to the Rajasthani language group and is commonly taken to be a dialect of Mewati, but in many respects it is intermediate with the neighbouring varieties of Bangru and Bagri, and is especially close to Shekhawati.

There are no reliable census figures for the number of speakers. In the past it was variously written in either Devanagari, Gurmukhi, or the Perso-Arabic script.

A peculiar feature of the grammar of Ahirwati is the use of the same postposition to mark both the agent (in certain tenses) and the object.

Geographic distribution 

Ahirwati is spoken mostly in the south of Haryana. At its maximal extent, its territory extends from Loharu in the west to Sohna in the east, and from Jhajjar and Najafgarh in the north to Bawal and Behror in the south. It encompasses partially or fully the districts of Mahendragarh, Jhajjar, Rewari, and Gurgaon, as well as the areas of Taoru in Nuh district (all in Haryana), Behror (in the district of Alwar, Rajasthan), Najafgarh (in Delhi), and additionally an enclave further to the north in the region of Hansi, in Hisar district.

Ahirwati's neighbouring dialects are Bangru and Bagri to the north, Shekhawati and Torawati to the west, and Mewati to the south.

References

Bibliography 

Indo-Aryan languages
Haryana